Monaleen GAA club is a Gaelic Athletic Association club located in Castletroy, County Limerick, Ireland. The club was founded in 1957 and fields teams in both Gaelic football and hurling. Camogie being the female hurling code is also played. With over 300 players playing camogie.

Honours

Football

 Limerick Senior Football Championship (6): 1978, 2002, 2005, 2010, 2011, 2016
 Limerick Intermediate Football Championship (1): 1976

Hurling

 Limerick Premier Intermediate Hurling Championship (2): 2016, 2022
 Munster Intermediate Club Hurling Championship (1): 2022
 All-Ireland Intermediate Club Hurling Championship (1): 2023
 Limerick Intermediate Hurling Championship (1): 1997

Junior A Camogie championship 2020

Notable players
 Brian Geary
 Lorcan Lyons
 Donnacha Ó Dálaigh

External links

Gaelic games clubs in County Limerick
Hurling clubs in County Limerick
Gaelic football clubs in County Limerick